Ytre may refer to:

People:
Knut Ytre-Arne (1896–1968), Norwegian politician for the Liberal Party

Places:
Ytre Østfold, the outer area of Østfold county (Norway) that has a fjord or coastal line
Ytre Øydnavatnet, lake in the municipality of Audnedal in Vest-Agder county, Norway
Ytre Arna, settlement in the borough of Arna in Bergen, Norway
Ytre Enebakk, village in the municipality of Enebakk, Norway
Ytre Norskøya, island on the northwest coast of Spitsbergen, part of the Svalbard archipelago
Ytre Oslofjord, that part of the Norwegian Oslofjord which is south of Drøbaksund
Ytre Rendal, former municipality in Hedmark county, Norway
Ytre Sandsvær, former municipality in Buskerud county, Norway
Ytre Sula, mountain in Surnadal, Møre og Romsdal, Norway
Ytre Tasta, neighborhood in the borough Tasta in Stavanger, Norway

See also
Ytres, commune in the Pas-de-Calais department in the Nord-Pas-de-Calais region of France